This is a list of Irish Travellers.

Politicians and activists
Laura Angela Collins, author of The Tinker Menace; The diary of an Irish Traveller, human rights activist, chairwomen to Justice 4 all women and children, attendee of the BRIT School
Mary Teresa Collins (born 1960s), Traveller human rights activist, a public survivor of the Irish state and church institutions and mother to the author Laura Angela Collins 
 Eileen Flynn (born 1990), Senator and first female Irish Traveller to serve in the Oireachtas
 Nan Joyce (1940–2018), pioneering Irish Travellers' rights activist
Sindy Joyce, the first Irish Traveller to obtain a doctorate from an Irish university, human rights activist, Member of the Council of State

Musicians
 Margaret Barry (1917–1989), singer
 Felix Doran (died 1972), one of the most influential uilleann pipers in the history of Irish music, active during the first half of the 20th century
Johnny Doran (1908–1950), Irish Uilleann piper, brother of Felix Doran
 Pecker Dunne (1933–2012), singer from County Wexford, Ireland.
 Finbar Furey (born 1946), Irish folk musician. He is best known for songs such as "Campfire in the Dark" and "Sweet Sixteen".
 Paddy Keenan (born 1950), piper, founding member of the Bothy Band in the 1970s and a key figure in the transition of Irish traditional music into the world of Celtic-dominated music
 John Reilly (1926–1969), traditional Irish singer and source of songs
 Mike Ward (born 1990), English singer and runner up/finalist from The Voice UK. He has Irish Traveller roots on his father's side and is also distant cousins with Shayne Ward.
 Shayne Ward (born 1984), English singer and former winner of X Factor , whose parents are Irish Travellers who settled in England

Athletes
 Francie Barrett (born 1972) represented Ireland at the Summer Olympics in Atlanta, Georgia in 1996.
 Hughie Fury (born 1994), professional boxer from Greater Manchester who won the British heavyweight title
 Tyson Fury (born 1988), professional boxer based in Manchester, England and WBC heavyweight champion
 Michael Gomez (born 1977), professional boxer based in Manchester, England, was born to an Irish Traveller family in County Longford
 Bartley Gorman (1944–2002), self declared "king" of the gypsies and undefeated bareknuckle boxing champion
 Nathan Gorman (born 1996), professional boxer from Cheshire who fought for the British Heavyweight title
Andy Lee (born 1984), former WBO Middleweight world champion
 John Joe Nevin (born 1988), boxer, Irish International, two-time Olympian, and a London 2012 silver medalist
 John O'Donnell (born 1985), boxer

Cinema, television, theatre
 Michael Collins, actor (King of the Travellers)
 Sean Connery (1930–2020), Scottish actor. He was the first actor to portray fictional British secret agent James in seven Bond films. Research revealed his paternal great-grandparents were Irish Travellers from County Wexford, Ireland.
 John Connors (born 1990), actor, screen writer, documentary film-maker and human rights activist (Love/Hate )
 Patrick "Paddy" Doherty (born 1959), former bare-knuckle boxer. He is best known as one of the interviewed Irish Travelers in My Big Fat Gypsy Wedding and the winner of Celebrity Big Brother 2011.
 Hughie Maughan, runner-up of Big Brother 17, contestant on the Irish Dancing with the Stars he also partook in First dates ireland 
 Rosaleen McDonagh, playwright

References

Irish Traveller
Travellers